Roman Ivanovich Tugarev (born 22 July 1998) is a Russian football player who plays as a left winger or right winger for FC Rostov.

Club career
He made his debut in the Russian Professional Football League for FC Kazanka Moscow on 19 July 2017 in a game against FC Znamya Truda Orekhovo-Zuyevo.

He made his debut in the Russian Premier League for FC Lokomotiv Moscow on 29 September 2018 in a game against FC Akhmat Grozny.

On 17 October 2020, he joined FC Rostov on loan until the end of the 2020–21 season.

On 12 February 2021, he moved to FC Rostov on a permanent basis and signed a 5-year contract with the club.

Honours

Club
Lokomotiv Moscow
 Russian Cup: 2018–19

Career statistics

References

External links
 
 
 
 Profile by Russian Professional Football League

1998 births
Sportspeople from Izhevsk
Living people
Russian footballers
Association football forwards
Russia youth international footballers
Russia under-21 international footballers
FC Lokomotiv Moscow players
FC Rostov players
Russian Premier League players
Russian Second League players